Slipstream is a 2007 American film starring, written, scored, and directed by Anthony Hopkins, which explores the premise of a screenwriter who is caught in a slipstream of time, memories, fantasy and reality. The film co-stars and was produced by Hopkins' wife Stella Arroyave, who also plays his wife. The film premiered at the 2007 Sundance Film Festival. Hopkins composed the music for the film, while British composer Harry Gregson-Williams scored and produced it.

Cast
 Anthony Hopkins as Felix Bonhoeffer
 Stella Arroyave as Gina Bonhoeffer
 Christian Slater as Ray / Matt Dodds / Patrolman #2
 John Turturro as Harvey Brickman
 Camryn Manheim as Barbara
 Jeffrey Tambor as Geek / Jeffrey / Dr. Geekman
 S. Epatha Merkerson as Bonnie
 Fionnula Flanagan as Bette Lustig
 Christopher Lawford as Lars
 Michael Clarke Duncan as Mort / Phil
 Lisa Pepper as Tracy
 Kevin McCarthy as himself
 Jana Grazer as herself
 Gavin Grazer as himself
 Aaron Tucker as Chauffeur / Aaron
 Lana Antonova as Lily
 William Lucking as Detective Buzz Larabee
 Saginaw Grant as Eddie

Production
Actor Anthony Hopkins first wrote the script for Slipstream for fun, saying, "I had no idea where it was going. It just kept evolving on itself. I always wanted to poke fun at the movie business and the acting profession – they take themselves so seriously. I wanted to poke them in the nose." Hopkins explained his perspective of the premise:

Hopkins initially shopped his script to studios for whom he had been bankable. Executives expressed interest as well as input for the script, but Hopkins refused to take the input. Hopkins showed the script to director-producer Steven Spielberg, who praised the dialogue but warned that financing would be difficult. He proceeded to begin production, initiating filming on June 12, 2006 in Los Angeles and moved to the California desert. Gina Arroyave, Hopkins' wife, was one of the producers and acted in the film as Hopkins' on-screen wife. Hopkins rejected studios who wanted to have a final cut of the film, and he instead found a new, unidentified patron to finance the film for under $10 million. During production, filmmakers invited six graduate students from Northern Illinois University to assist with the film for college credit. Hopkins also composed the score for Slipstream and conducted the orchestra for the music. In post-production, Hopkins used quick editing and digital technology to edit a fast-paced cut of Slipstream to speed audiences through the film.

Release
The film later experienced a one-week limited release in 6 theaters in the United States on October 26, 2007, earning $6,273 over the weekend and $8,965 in the full week. The film closed on November 1, 2007, after a week at the box office grossing $8,965 in the North American domestic market and $18,804 in other territories for an international total of $27,769.

Reception
Slipstream premiered at the 2007 Sundance Film Festival on January 20, 2007. The film was met with confusion by Sundance audiences, who wondered about the actual meaning of the premise.

The film was panned by critics. On the film review aggregation website Rotten Tomatoes the film has an approval rating of 23% based on reviews from 40 critics. On Metacritic, the film has a score of 47 out of 100 based on reviews from 14 reviews, indicating "mixed or average reviews".

Not all reviews were negative. Roger Ebert gave the film three out of four stars and suggested that the film is worth seeing:

See also
 Dietrich Bonhoeffer
 August (1996 film directed by Anthony Hopkins)

References

External links
 
 
 
 Interview with Slipstream director Anthony Hopkins at Filmmaker Magazine

2007 films
2007 science fiction films
Films directed by Anthony Hopkins
Films scored by Harry Gregson-Williams
2000s English-language films
American science fiction comedy-drama films
2000s American films